Liénard is a surname. Notable people with the surname include:

François Liénard de la Mivoye (1782–1862), French-Mauritian naturalist
Édouard Liénard (1779–1848), French painter
Alfred-Marie Liénard (1869–1958), French physicist and engineer
Michel Joseph Napoléon Liénard (1810–1870), sculptor from France
Daniel Liénard de Beaujeu, French officer during the Seven Years' War
Liénard–Wiechert potential describes the electromagnetic effect of a moving electric charge
Liénard equation, type of differential equation, after the French physicist Alfred-Marie Liénard